Macedonia Baptist Church may refer to:

 Macedonia Baptist Church (Denver, Colorado), listed on the National Register of Historic Places (NRHP)
 Macedonia Baptist Church (Holden, Louisiana), listed on the NRHP in Louisiana
 Macedonia Baptist Church (Buffalo, New York), listed on the NRHP in Erie County, New York
 Macedonia Baptist Church (Burlington, Ohio)
 Macedonia Baptist Church (Cuero, Texas), listed on the NRHP in Texas
 Macedonia Baptist Church (Clarendon County, South Carolina), burned down by members of the KKK in 1996